James Gordon Stuart Grant ( 1834 – 27 February 1902) was a New Zealand demagogue, journalist and eccentric. He was born in Glenlivet, Banffshire, Scotland in circa 1834.

He unsuccessfully stood in the 1859 Town of Dunedin by-election against James Macandrew. He won election to the Otago Provincial Council in an October 1865 by-election and was a member until 1867 when he did not stand for re-election. Instead, he stood for superintendent of the Otago Province but only received 2 of the 3,653 votes cast.

 

He died penniless in 1902.

Publications
The Cynic,  Dunedin  1875

References

1830s births
1902 deaths
New Zealand journalists
Scottish emigrants to New Zealand
People from Banffshire
Members of the Otago Provincial Council
19th-century New Zealand journalists
Unsuccessful candidates in the 1866 New Zealand general election